The Ankerwycke Yew is an ancient yew tree close to the ruins of St Mary's Priory, the site of a Benedictine nunnery built in the 12th century, near Wraysbury in Berkshire, England. The tree is at least 1,400 years old, and could be as old as 2,500 years.

On the opposite bank of the River Thames are the meadows of Runnymede and this tree is said to have been witness to the signing of Magna Carta. The tree is also said to be the location where Henry VIII courted Anne Boleyn in the 1530s.

There is some justification for the theory that the Ankerwycke Yew could be "the last surviving witness to the sealing of the Magna Carta 800 years ago". "In the 13th century, the landscape would have been different as the area was probably rather marshy as it was within the flood plain of the Thames. The Ankerwycke Yew is on a slightly raised area of land (therefore dry) and with the proximity of the Priory perhaps both lend some credibility to this claim."

The Ankerwycke Yew is situated on lands managed by the National Trust. In 2002 it was designated one of fifty Great British Trees by The Tree Council.

See also
 Fortingall Yew
 List of oldest trees

References

External links
Magna Carta and the Ankerwycke Yew
Photos of a trek to the Ankerwyke Yew
Ancient yews under threat in Churchyards and sacred groves

Individual yew trees
Individual trees in England
History of Berkshire
History of the River Thames
Royal Borough of Windsor and Maidenhead
Magna Carta